The 1896 World Figure Skating Championships was an annual figure skating competition sanctioned by the International Skating Union in which figure skaters compete for the title of World Champion. The first competition took place on February 9, 1896 in Saint Petersburg, Russian Empire.

In 1895, the International Skating Union organized the first World Figure Skating Championships committee, which consisted of 5 people. This committee was entrusted with preparation and presentation of the figure skating rules. ISU also confirmed that World Figure Skating Championships will be held and that in the meantime men skaters should comply with the rules not yet published.

Results

Men

Men. Five Special Figures

Judges:
 Mr. C. Korper von Marienwert 
 Mr. H. Kurtén 
 Mr. Georg Helfrich 
 Mr. P. E. Wolf 
 Mr. A. Ivashenzov

References

Sources
 Result List by the ISU

World Figure Skating Championships
World Figure Skating Championships, 1896
1896 in the Russian Empire
International figure skating competitions hosted by Russia
Sports competitions in Saint Petersburg
February 1896 sports events
1890s in Saint Petersburg